Little Brother, Big Trouble: A Christmas Adventure (also known as Niko 2: Little Brother, Big Trouble, or simply Niko 2), is a 2012 Finnish-Danish-Irish 3D computer animated comedy/adventure film, produced by Finnish Anima Vitae and Cinemaker OY with co-producers Ulysses (Germany), A. Film (Denmark), Tidal Films (Ireland). The animation was produced in Finland, Germany and Denmark, with post-production carried out in Ireland. It was released in Finland on October 12, 2012. Anima Vitae and Cinemaker OY were nominated for Cartoon Movie Tributes 2013 in the category “European Producer of the Year”. Like a predecessor, it is one of the most expensive Finnish films.

Plot
The sequel takes places a couple of months after the events of the first film, and follows the story of Niko the reindeer. He must deal with his mother Oona getting remarried. He gains a stepbrother named Jonni, whom Niko hates at first. However, when Jonni gets kidnapped by eagles, Niko flies off to rescue him.

During his journey, Niko is joined by an old, near-blind reindeer named Tobias, who is revealed to be the former leader of Santa Claus's reindeer, Santa's Flying Forces. However, standing in Niko's way is also White Wolf, Black Wolf's younger sister, who is the leader of the eagles and wants revenge on Niko for her brother's death.

Now, Niko and the rest of the team must come up with a plan to save Jonni, defeat White Wolf and return home. At the end of the film, Oona is revealed to have given birth to an unnamed fawn and introduces Niko and Jonni to their new half-sister.

Cast

English Version 

 Matthew Boyle as Niko
 Darragh Kelly as Julius
 Ned Dennehy as Tobias
 Callum Maloney as Jonni
 Michael Sheehan as Lenni
 Niamh Shaw as White Wolf
 Susan Slott as Oona
 Aileen Mythen as Wilma
 Carly Baker as Saga
 Roger Gregg as Dasher
 Paul Tylak as Prancer
 Mark Ryan as Lockdown
 Leigh Whannell as Jatt
 Angus Sampson as Jutt

Finnish Version 

 Kari Hietalahti as Armas
 Juha Veijonen as Raavas
 Kari Ketonen as Spede
 Risto Kaskilahti as Uljas
 Erik Carlson as Niko
 Elina Knihtilä as Oana
 Mikko Kivinen as Julius
 Vuokko Hovatta as Wilma
 Aarre Karén as Topias
 Riku Nieminen as Lenni
 Juhana Vaittinen as Jonni
 Katariina Kaitue as White Wolf

Release
Little Brother, Big Trouble: A Christmas Adventure was shown at the Hamburg Film Festival on 29 September 2012.

It was released in Finland on October 12, 2012. The film opened in 115 theatres and was seen by 150,889 viewers, grossing €1,384,148.

It was released in Japan on August 9, 2013, after being shown at the Kinder Film Festival.

It entered into limited European distribution in November and December 2013 in Germany, Denmark, Poland, France, Iceland, Netherlands, Russia, Belgium, Estonia, and in Asia in Korea, Israel in March 2013.

Later in the fall of 2013 it was released in Croatia, Serbia, Turkey, Portugal, Hungary, and Sweden.

In 2014, the film was released in Kuwait, China, Spain (limited), and Peru.

The film was released in the U.S. via Grindstone and Netflix in October 2013.

It moved to new territories in late October 2013.

Home media
Little Brother, Big Trouble was released in Finland on DVD and Blu-ray on November 13, 2013.  It was released in the U.S. on October 29, 2013.

Reception
Despite not having a rating as of yet in Rotten Tomatoes, Little Brother, Big Trouble: A Christmas Adventure has received generally mixed to positive reviews. The Internet Movie Database (IMDb) gave Little Brother, Big Trouble: A Christmas Adventure a 5.9 rating out of 10.  Collectively, reviewers on Amazon.com have given the film a rating of 4 out of 5 stars. Reception for Niko 2 in Japan was quite strong and as a result it was awarded the Grand Prix of the best film in feature section in Tokyo Kinder Film Festival.

Soundtrack
The film's original score was composed by Stephen McKeon once again. The original score can be found for example in Spotify "Niko 2 – Little Brother, Big Trouble (Original Score)".

"The Way to the Stars" - Sean Dexter
"All About Us" - t.A.T.u

See also
 List of Christmas films

References

External links
Official website 

Niko 2 on the main producer's website 

2012 computer-animated films
2012 films
3D films
2012 3D films
Finnish 3D films
Finnish animated films
Animated adventure films
Finnish adventure films
Finnish sequel films
2010s adventure films
Santa Claus's reindeer
Films about deer and moose
2010s Finnish-language films